Matrix metalloproteinase-16 is an enzyme that in humans is encoded by the MMP16 gene.

Proteins of the matrix metalloproteinase (MMP) family are involved in the breakdown of extracellular matrix in normal physiological processes, such as embryonic development, reproduction, and tissue remodeling, as well as in disease processes, such as arthritis and metastasis. Most MMP's are secreted as inactive proproteins which are activated when cleaved by extracellular proteinases. This gene produces at least two transcripts, one which encodes a membrane-bound form and another a soluble form of the protein. Both forms of the protein activate MMP2 by cleavage. This gene was once referred to as MT-MMP2, but was renamed as MT-MMP3 or MMP16.

References

Further reading

External links
 The MEROPS online database for peptidases and their inhibitors: M10.016
 

Matrix metalloproteinases
EC 3.4.24